Ryszard Bugaj (born February 22, 1944 in Gawłów, Masovian Voivodeship) is a Polish politician and economist, former leader of Unia Pracy (Labour Union) and former advisor to the then president of Poland, Lech Kaczyński.

See also
 Politics of Poland
 Unia Pracy

References

1944 births
Living people
20th-century Polish politicians
20th-century Polish economists
Labour Union (Poland) politicians
People from Sochaczew County
University of Warsaw alumni
21st-century Polish economists